Karim Dridi (born 9 January 1961 in tunis) is a French Tunisian film director and screenwriter. He has directed ten films since 1987. His 1994 film Pigalle was entered into the main competition at the 51st edition of the Venice Film Festival. His film Bye-Bye was screened in the Un Certain Regard section at the 1995 Cannes Film Festival.

Filmography
 Dans le sac (1987)
 Zoé la boxeuse (1992)
 Pigalle (1994)
 Bye-Bye (1995)
 Hors jeu (1998)
 Cuba feliz (2000)
 Fureur (2003)
 Gris blanc (2005)
 Khamsa (2008)
 The Last Flight (2009)

References

External links

1961 births
Living people
French film directors
French male screenwriters
French screenwriters